Catherina Elisabeth Schouten (1887–1967) was a Dutch painter.

Biography 
Schouten  was born on 28 April 1877 in Amsterdam. She studied at the Rijksakademie van beeldende kunsten (State Academy of Fine Arts) in Amsterdam. Her work was included in the 1939 exhibition and sale Onze Kunst van Heden (Our Art of Today) at the Rijksmuseum in Amsterdam.

In 1910 Schouten married fellow artist Co Breman (1865–1938). Soon after their marriage the couple spent two years in Italy. Schouten died on 21 October 1967 in Laren, North Holland.

References

External links
image of Schouten's work at RKD

1887 births
1967 deaths
Artists from Amsterdam
20th-century Dutch women artists